By the time of Pakistan's independence in 1947, Karachi had become a bustling metropolis with slightly under half a million people, and classical and colonial European styled buildings lining the city's thoroughfares. Karachi, the capital of Sindh province was also chosen as the capital of Pakistan. In 1958, the capital of Pakistan was moved from Karachi to Rawalpindi. The foreign embassies in Karachi moved to the newly developed capital Islamabad, near Rawalpindi. There are Consulates and Honorary Consulates as Diplomatic missions in the actual Federal Capital of Pakistan, Karachi.

This is a list of Consulates-General in Karachi, Sindh, Pakistan. The embassies in Pakistan are located in the Diplomatic Enclave in the capital, Islamabad.

Career Consulates

 Consulate General
 Consulate General
 Deputy High Commission
 Consulate General
 Consulate General
 Consulate General
 Consulate General
 Consulate General
 Consulate General of Italy in Karachi
 Consulate General
 Consulate General
 Consulate General
 Consulate General
 Consulate General
 Consulate General
 Consulate General
 Consulate General
 Consulate General
 Branch Office 
 Consulate General
 Consulate General
 Consulate General
 Deputy High Comimission
 Consulate General

Honorary Consuls

See also
 List of diplomatic missions of Pakistan
 Foreign relations of Pakistan
 Visa requirements for Pakistani citizens

References
General
Ministry of Foreign Affairs of Pakistan
Foreign missions in Pakistan
Citations